"Break Ya Neck" is the second single by American rapper Busta Rhymes from his fifth album Genesis (2001). The song was produced by Dr. Dre and Scott Storch. Truth Hurts provides background vocals. The song contains an interpolation of the Red Hot Chili Peppers song "Give It Away". The official remix of the single features Twista and Do or Die.

Music video
The music video for this song was directed by Hype Williams and it was released on October 16, 2001. It features cameos from other artists such as Spliff Star, Diddy, Ludacris, Fabolous, Crunchy Black of Three 6 Mafia, Dr. Dre, Ice Cube, Lil Jon and The East Side Boyz, Swizz Beatz, CeeLo Green, Big Gipp and Khujo.

Charts

Weekly charts

Year-end charts

Certifications

References

Busta Rhymes songs
2001 singles
Songs written by Scott Storch
Songs written by Mike Elizondo
Song recordings produced by Dr. Dre
Songs written by Dr. Dre
Songs written by Busta Rhymes
Music videos directed by Hype Williams
Songs written by Anthony Kiedis
Songs written by Chad Smith
Songs written by Flea (musician)
Songs written by John Frusciante
2001 songs
J Records singles